The .246 Purdey, also known as the .246 Flanged, is an obsolete centerfire rifle cartridge developed by James Purdey & Sons and introduced in 1921.

Overview
The .246 Purdey is a rimmed cartridge originally designed for use in Purdey's own double rifles. Never popular or widely used, the cartridge offers slightly less power than the .243 Winchester.

As is common with cartridges designed for double rifles, the .246 Purdey was offered in one loading, firing a 100 gr projectile at 2950 fps.

See also
List of rifle cartridges
6 mm rifle cartridges

References

Footnotes

Bibliography
 Barnes, Frank C., Cartridges of the World, 15th ed, Gun Digest Books, Iola, 2016, .
 Municon, ".246 Purdey Nitro Express", municion.org , retrieved 17 April 2017.
 van Zwoll, Wayne, Shooter's bible guide to reloading: A comprehensive reference for responsible and  reliable reloading, Skyhorse Publishing, New York, 2015, .

External links
 Ammo-One, "246 Purdey", ammo-one.com, retrieved 17 April 2017.
 Cartridgecollector, ".246 Purdey", cartridgecollector.net, retrieved 17 April 2017.

Pistol and rifle cartridges
British firearm cartridges
James Purdey & Sons cartridges